Hudspith is a surname. Notable people with the surname include:

 Geoff Hudsmith, creator of the Hudspith Steam Bicycle
 Karl Hudspith (born 1988), British rower and scientist
 Mark Hudspith (born 1969), British long-distance runner

See also
 Hudspeth (surname)